József Tóth (born 5 February 1950) is a Hungarian politician, who has been the mayor of Angyalföld (13th district of Budapest) since 1994. He was also a member of the National Assembly (MP) for Angyalföld (Budapest Constituency XX) from 2002 to 2014. He is a member of the Hungarian Socialist Party.

References

1950 births
Living people
Mayors of places in Hungary
Members of the Hungarian Socialist Workers' Party
Hungarian Socialist Party politicians
Members of the National Assembly of Hungary (2002–2006)
Members of the National Assembly of Hungary (2006–2010)
Members of the National Assembly of Hungary (2010–2014)
People from Budapest